Protos means "first," derived from the ancient Greek . 

Protos may also refer to:
 Protos (monastic office), a monastic office at the Eastern Orthodox monastic state of Mount Athos
 Protos (constructor), a former racing car constructor
 Protos of Nonnendamm, a defunct German motor vehicle manufacturer
 PROTOS (train), a German train
 Protos (album), the 2014 eleventh album by Norwegian electronic dance music producer Aleksander "Savant" Vinter
 PROTOS, a project by OUSPG
 Protos, a marketing name for Strontium ranelate
 Protos, one of the winemakers in the Ribera del Duero region
 Protos, a name given to the bishop of Rome in the declaration of Ravenna
 Protos, a model helicopter developed by MSH
 Ioannis Protos, a Greek athlete
 Protos o Hlios, a song by Mikis Theodorakis
 Protos – PROgram for TOp Simulations, Monte Carlo generator for Top quarks and new heavy particles

See also 
 Proto-
 Protoss